Starobaltachevo (İśke Baltas) is a rural locality (a village) in Ismailovsky Selsoviet, Dyurtyulinsky District, Bashkortostan, Russia. The population was 128 as of 2010. There are 3 streets.

Geography 
Starobaltachevo is located 15 km northwest of Dyurtyuli (the district's administrative centre) by road. Yuntiryak and Kushulevo are the nearest rural localities.

References 

Rural localities in Dyurtyulinsky District